Filip Polc (born 4 April 1982) is a Slovak downhill mountain biker. He most notably won the European Downhill Championships in 2001. He was also the national downhill champion in 1998, 2004, 2005, 2006, 2007 and 2008. In 2001, he was designated the Slovak Cyclist of the Year.

Major results

1997
 1st  National Dual-slalom Championships
 3rd  European Junior Downhill Championships
1998
 1st  National Downhill Championships
 1st  National Dual-slalom Championships
 3rd  European Junior Downhill Championships
1999
 1st  National Dual-slalom Championships
2001
 1st  European Downhill Championships
2004
 1st  National Downhill Championships
2005
 1st  National Downhill Championships
2006
 1st  National Downhill Championships
2007
 1st  National Downhill Championships
2008
 1st  National Downhill Championships
 1st  National Four-cross Championships
2010
 1st Valparaíso Cerro Abajo
2011
 1st Valparaíso Cerro Abajo
2014
 1st Valparaíso Cerro Abajo
2015
 1st Valparaíso Cerro Abajo

References

Slovak mountain bikers
Slovak male cyclists
1982 births
Living people
Sportspeople from Bratislava